is an action role-playing video game developed and published by Nippon Ichi Software, by the same development team as Penny-Punching Princess and The Princess Guide. It released in Japan on June 25, 2020, and in North America on April 13, 2021, and in Europe on April 16, 2021. It revolves around a gender-selectable human main character who must purify the individual "Belles' Hells" of various girls in order to escape Hell.

Plot 
"Belles' Hells" are spiritual realms created by the powerful emotions, or "Delusions", of various girls. However, the Delusions manifest as physical beings, or Klesha, who try to stop the protagonist and steal their body. One such Klesha is Poisonette, who steals the protagonist's body at the start of the game, but makes them work with her to purify the other Klesha and save the girls they belong to.

Gameplay 
There are five major areas of the game that the player must beat.

Reception 
The game has been compared to a fusion of a third-person shooter and Qix. Areas consisting of poison swamps must be rounded off to "purify" and beat them.

References 

2020 video games
Action role-playing video games
Nintendo Switch games
Nippon Ichi Software games
PlayStation 4 games
Single-player video games
Video games about spirit possession
Video games developed in Japan
Video games set in hell
Video games featuring protagonists of selectable gender